Irfan Sajid (born 1 January 1983) is a Pakistani-born cricketer who played for the United Arab Emirates national cricket team. He made his One Day International debut for the United Arab Emirates against Afghanistan in the 2014 ACC Premier League on 2 May 2014.

References

External links
 

1983 births
Living people
Emirati cricketers
United Arab Emirates One Day International cricketers
Place of birth missing (living people)
Pakistani emigrants to the United Arab Emirates
Pakistani expatriate sportspeople in the United Arab Emirates